Snaps is the debut studio album by American hip hop producer Mr. Hill, a member of the Pacific Northwest hip hop collective Oldominion. It was released December 2, 2006 on Hal Cush Music.

Music 
The album is fully produced by Mr. Hill, and features guest appearances from artists such as IAME, Onry Ozzborn and Boom Bap Project, among others.

Reception 
Snaps was given generally favorable reviews, one of which being from The Stranger, who said about the album: "Strings are his specialty, which he employs for cinematic effects and moods that correspond with Gothic architecture and the dark factories of the industrial revolution. But as Snaps makes clear, Mr. Hill is not confined to the cathedral aesthetic that he regularly programs for associates of Oldominion."

Track listing

References

External links 
 Snaps at Bandcamp
 Snaps at Discogs

2006 debut albums
Instrumental hip hop albums